The Bi-State Vietnam Gold Star Twin Bridges, (usually referred to as simply  The Twin Bridges, despite differences in their widths), are located in Henderson County, Kentucky and connect Henderson, Kentucky, and Evansville, Indiana, along U.S. Route 41 (US 41),  south of the current southern terminus of Interstate 69 (I-69). The two bridges average more than 40,000 vehicles crossings a day across the Ohio River.

The northbound bridge opened to traffic on July 4, 1932. The more historic northbound bridge will remain in service for US-41 as a two way bridge.

Both of the Bi-State Vietnam Gold Star Bridges are cantilever bridges.

An unusual fact about the bridges is that they are entirely within Kentucky. Although the Ohio River forms most of the border between Kentucky and Indiana, the state border is based on the course of the river as it existed when Kentucky became a state in 1792. Due to the New Madrid earthquake of 1812, the river changed course to the south, leaving the land where the bridges cross the river within Kentucky.

History

The northbound span of the Bi-State Vietnam Gold Star Bridges was the second of three bridges built in Henderson County in 1932, a building novelty during the Great Depression. It was originally named the John James Audubon Bridge, or Audubon Memorial Bridge, after John James Audubon, who lived in Henderson in the 1810s. It was built by notable bridge designer Ralph Modjeski.

The dedication ceremony featured Kentucky Governor Ruby Laffoon and Indiana Governor Harry G. Leslie shaking hands with one another, as 22 military planes under the command of Jimmy Doolittle flew overhead with cannon fire and boat whistles in the distance celebrating the occasion.  A flotilla of boats passed under the bridge, taking 40 minutes to do so and a  parade lasting two hours also celebrated the occasion. More than 100,000 visitors attended the celebration and 111,091 vehicles crossed the bridge in its first two days of operation, creating delays of up to two hours to go from Henderson to Evansville.

With the influx of tourists using US 41 to cross the Ohio River, the city of Henderson decided to take advantage of the bridge by establishing John James Audubon State Park in 1936. Originally, crossing the bridge required paying a toll, usually 30 to 35 cents for cars, and a nickel for pedestrians. The toll was removed on March 20, 1941.

Renovations

In 2007, the Bi-State Vietnam Gold Star Bridges underwent $22 million in renovations involving maintenance and painting. Kentucky Governor Ernie Fletcher directed that at least two lanes in each direction should remain open during the construction. The maintenance ended in the middle of 2008. The last time the northbound bridge was rehabbed was in 1983.

After the I-35W Mississippi River bridge collapsed in Minneapolis, Minnesota, in August 2007, officials stated that the main threat to the safety of the Bi-State Vietnam Gold Star Bridges would be a "catastrophic earthquake". This statement was made before the 2008 Illinois earthquake. After the 5.2 earthquake hit, Kentucky Transportation Cabinet spokesman Keith Todd said that such a quake "would not be expected to cause damage to well-engineered structures." However, both bridges were inspected as a precaution. Aside from earthquakes, another particular concern is the presence of the two piers holding  the three central spans on each bridge inside the river transit lanes. The bridges have been struck at least once every 5 years on average.

The bridges are located at 37°54'15" N, 87°33'02" W. Although they are not currently on the list, they have been ruled eligible for inclusion in the National Register of Historic Places.

See also
 List of crossings of the Ohio River
 Henderson Bridge: a nearby rail bridge over the Ohio River

References

Bridges completed in 1932
Bridges completed in 1966
Bridges over the Ohio River
Road bridges in Kentucky
U.S. Route 41
Bridges of the United States Numbered Highway System
Former toll bridges in Kentucky
Cantilever bridges in the United States
Steel bridges in the United States
Buildings and structures in Henderson County, Kentucky
Interstate vehicle bridges in the United States
Transportation in Evansville, Indiana